is a railway station in the town of Mogami, Yamagata, Japan, operated by East Japan Railway Company (JR East).

Lines
Tachikōji Station is served by the Rikuu East Line, and is located 62.8 rail kilometers from the terminus of the line at Kogota Station.

Station layout
The station has one side platform, serving a single bidirectional track. The station building is built directly on the platform. The station is unattended.

History
Tachikōji Station opened on July 10, 1959. The station was absorbed into the JR East network upon the privatization of JNR on April 1, 1987.

Surrounding area

See also
List of railway stations in Japan

External links

 JR East Station information 

Railway stations in Yamagata Prefecture
Rikuu East Line
Railway stations in Japan opened in 1959
Mogami, Yamagata